{{Infobox film
| name           = Immortal Sergeant
| image          = Immortal Sergeant.jpg
| image_size     =
| alt            = 
| border         = 
| caption        = 
| director       = John M. Stahl
| writer         = Lamar Trotti
| based_on       = {{based on|Immortal Sergeant|John Brophy}}
| producer       = Lamar Trotti
| starring       = Henry FondaMaureen O'HaraThomas Mitchell
| cinematography = Arthur Miller
| editing        = James B. Clark
| music          = David Buttolph
| color_process  = Black and white
| studio         = 20th Century Fox
| distributor    = 20th Century Fox
| released       = 
| runtime        = 91 minutes
| country        = United States
| language       = English
| budget         = 
| gross          = $2.2 million (US rentals) 
}}Immortal Sergeant is a 1943 American war film directed by John M. Stahl for 20th Century Fox. Set in the North African desert during World War II, it stars Henry Fonda as a corporal lacking in confidence in both love and war, Maureen O'Hara as his girlfriend, and Thomas Mitchell as the title character. The film was based on the 1942 novel of the same name by John Brophy.

Plot
In North Africa, experienced Sergeant Kelly (Thomas Mitchell) leads out a British patrol, accompanied by Corporal Colin Spence (Henry Fonda), an unassertive Canadian. When they are attacked by Italian airplanes, they manage to shoot one down, but it crashes on one of their vehicles, killing eight men. Later, Kelly  leads the six survivors on an attack of an Italian armored car, but is seriously wounded. He orders Spence to leave him behind; when Spence refuses to obey, he shoots himself.

Spence leads the remaining three men towards an oasis. Before they can reach it though, a transport plane lands and disgorges German soldiers who set up a base. After sneaking in to steal badly needed food and water, Spence has to assert his leadership when one of his men advocates surrendering. Instead, Spence leads them in a surprise attack under the cover of a sandstorm. The British emerge victorious, though one man is killed and Spence is wounded.

The corporal comes to in a Cairo hospital and finds he is to be given a medal and promoted to lieutenant. His newfound assertiveness extends to his personal life. He proposes to his girlfriend Valentine (Maureen O'Hara), whom he had thought of (in flashbacks) throughout his ordeal.

Cast
 Henry Fonda as Col. Colin Spence
 Maureen O'Hara as Valentine Lee
 Thomas Mitchell as Sgt. Kelly
 Allyn Joslyn as Cassity
 Reginald Gardiner as Tom Benedict
 Melville Cooper as Pilcher
 Bramwell Fletcher as Symes
 Morton Lowry as Cottrell

Reception
Theodore Strauss of The New York Times called the film "disappointing", writing that while it was "occasionally a warm and human study of a man's triumph over his own fears," the romance was "vapid" and O'Hara's character was "very dull". Variety called the film "a compact drama, interestingly told." Harrison's Reports wrote, "Although it does not reach great dramatic heights, and it is somewhat long drawn out, the production and the performances are so good that one's interest is held consistently." David Lardner of The New Yorker'' wrote that the desert peril scenes were the "most solid aspects of the picture and, since they are fairly well handled, succeed in putting it on its feet." Lardner was distracted, however, by "the strange difficulty O'Hara seems to have in pronouncing polysyllabic words."

References

External links 
 
 
 

1943 films
1943 romantic drama films
1940s war films
20th Century Fox films
American romantic drama films
American black-and-white films
Films based on British novels
Films based on military novels
Films directed by John M. Stahl
Films scored by David Buttolph
North African campaign films
World War II films made in wartime
American war drama films
Films set in London
1940s English-language films